Signa is an opera originally conceived in four acts with music by the British composer Frederic H. Cowen with a libretto by Gilbert Arthur à Beckett, with revisions by H.A. Rudall and Frederic Edward Weatherly after Ouida, with an Italian translation by Giannandrea Mazzucato, first performed in a reduced three-act version at the Teatro Dal Verme, Milan on 12 November 1893. It was later given in a two-act version at Covent Garden, London on 30 June 1894.

References

 Cowen, F. H., My Art and My Friends, London, Arnold, 1913
 Sadie, S. (ed.) (1980) The New Grove Dictionary of Music & Musicians, 5.
 Burton, N., Grove Music Online (ed. Macy, L.) <http://www.grovemusic.com>.
 Parker, C. J. (2007), unpublished Ph.D Thesis (University of Durham, U.K.): 'The Music of Sir Frederic Hymen Cowen (1852–1935): a Critical Study'.

Operas
1893 operas
English-language operas
Operas by Frederic H. Cowen
Operas based on novels
Adaptations of works by Ouida